Gergely Délczeg (born 9 August 1987) is a Hungarian professional footballer who plays for Haladás.

Club statistics

Updated to games played as of 7 April 2014.

External links

 Gergely Délczeg at HLSZ
 Gergely Délczeg at MLSZ
 

1987 births
Living people
Footballers from Budapest
Hungarian footballers
Association football forwards
Rákospalotai EAC footballers
Zalaegerszegi TE players
BFC Siófok players
Budapest Honvéd FC players
Paksi FC players
Kisvárda FC players
Dorogi FC footballers
Szombathelyi Haladás footballers
Nemzeti Bajnokság I players
Nemzeti Bajnokság II players